Birgit Rosengren (November 27, 1912 – October 6, 2011) was a Swedish film actress born in Stockholm, and most active from the 1930s to the early 1960s.

Rosengren made her film debut in 1934's Flickorna från Gamla Sta'n, directed by Schamyl Bauman. She was widowed twice. Her first husband was actor and film director Elof Ahrle, who died in 1965. Her second husband was Swedish actor Eric Gustafson. She lived in retirement at her home in Bromma, Stockholm. She remained active, giving a full interview to the Swedish newspaper, Svenska Dagbladet, shortly before her 98th birthday in 2010.

Her closest friends included Lasse Lönndahl and Göte Wilhelmsson. Rosengren died from complications of a fracture on October 6, 2011, at the age of 98.

Filmography
 The Women Around Larsson  (1934)
 Flickorna från Gamla Sta'n (1934)
 Flickor på fabrik (1935)
 Larsson i andra giftet (1935)
The Quartet That Split Up  (1936)
Skicka hem Nr. 7 (1937)
 En sjöman går iland (1937)
 Kloka gubben (1938)
 Wanted (1939)
 Åh, en så'n advokat (1940)
 Lillebror och jag (1940)
 Uppåt igen (1941)
 Motherhood  (1945)
 Sextetten Karlsson (1945)
 Skådetennis (1945)
 Åke klarar biffen (1952)
 My Passionate Longing (1956)
 Gäst hos bagaren (1958)
 Här kommer Petter (1963)
I frid och värdighet (1979)

References

External links

Further reading  
  

1912 births
2011 deaths
Swedish film actresses
Actresses from Stockholm
20th-century Swedish actresses